Sarıgöl is a town and district of Manisa Province in the Aegean region of Turkey. According to the 2000 census, population of the district is 35,621 of which 12,043 live in the town of Sarıgöl.

History
Sarıgöl is a small town located between the provinces of Denizli and Manisa. According to some historians, it has been an important city throughout history. There was an ancient city called Callatebus (Kallatebos) in the vicinity of today's Sarıgöl. The city of Kallatebos (Calletebus) was mentioned by Herodotus in his 7th book's 31st district. The city was between Philadelphia (Alaşehir) and Hierapolis (Pamukkale).

Notes

References

External links
 District governor's official website 
 District municipality's official website 
 Road map of Sarıgöl and environs
 Various images of Sarıgöl

Populated places in Manisa Province
Districts of Manisa Province